The 2017 Judo Grand Slam was held in Ekaterinburg, Russia, from 20 to 21 March 2017.

Medal summary

Men's events

Women's events

Source Results

Medal table

References

External links
 

2017 IJF World Tour
2017 Judo Grand Slam
Judo